Living Room Suite is the eighth studio album by the American singer-songwriter Harry Chapin, released in 1978.

The album peaked at No. 133 on the Billboard 200.

Production
The album was produced by Chuck Plotkin.  Chapin and his label were unhappy with the album, with Chapin going back to the studio to rerecord a few of the songs after the album had been released.

Critical reception
Record Collector wrote that "musically, Harry occasionally steps out of his folk-friendly comfort zone, serving up some delicious blue-eyed soul on 'It Seems You Only Love Me When It Rains'."

Track listing

Personnel
Harry Chapin – guitar, vocals
George Bohanon – trombone
David Burgen – harmonica
Stephen Chapin – keyboards
Tom Chapin – banjo, guitar
The Cowsills – vocals
Bob Cowsill – guitar
Dixie Hummingbirds – vocals
Howie Fields – drums, percussion
Chuck Findley – trumpet
Steve Forman – percussion
Dennis Frick – bassoon
Richard Hyde – trombone
Neil Jason – bass
Jackie Kelso – baritone saxophone
Jim Keltner – drums
Steve Madaio – trumpet
Andy Newmark – drums
Bill Payne – organ
Herbert Rhoad – vocals
Joe Russell – vocals
Kim Scholes – cello
Lou Volpe – guitar
Doug Walker – guitar
John Wallace – bass, vocals
Ernie Watts – clarinet, flute, oboe, saxophone
Sarah Jessica Parker – vocals (uncredited), "Flowers are Red"

Charts

References

External links

Harry Chapin albums
1978 albums
Albums produced by Chuck Plotkin
Elektra Records albums